Bonaparte's nightjar (Caprimulgus concretus), also known as the Sunda nightjar, is a species of nightjar in the family Caprimulgidae. It is found in the islands of Sumatra, Belitung and Borneo. Its natural habitat is subtropical or tropical moist lowland forests. It is threatened by habitat loss.

References

External links
BirdLife Species Factsheet.

Bonaparte's nightjar
Birds of Malesia
Bonaparte's nightjar
Bonaparte's nightjar
Taxonomy articles created by Polbot